De Tatta's (Dutch for: The ) is a 2022 Dutch comedy film directed by Jamel Aattache. The film won the Golden Film award after having sold 100,000 tickets. The film also won the Platinum Film award after having sold 400,000 tickets. In January 2023, the film surpassed half a million tickets sold.

In the film, a wealthy family from an affluent neighbourhood moves to a poor neighbourhood after financial problems. Initially, the film was supposed to take place in the Gooi near Hilversum and the Bijlmermeer neighbourhood of Amsterdam but these names were changed to fictional neighbourhoods after criticism.

Leo Alkemade, Leonie ter Braak and Oussama Ahammoud play a role in the film. Principal photography took place in 2022.

A sequel was announced in March 2023.

References

External links 

 

2022 films
2020s Dutch-language films
Dutch comedy films
2022 comedy films
Films directed by Jamel Aattache
Films shot in the Netherlands
Films set in the Netherlands